Dragoslava "Dragana" Gerić (Serbian Cyrillic: Драгослава Герић, 7 August 1947 – 21 March 2011) was a Serbian and Yugoslavian former female basketball player.

References

External links
Biography

1947 births
2011 deaths
Basketball players from Belgrade
Serbian women's basketball players
Yugoslav women's basketball players
ŽKK Crvena zvezda players